Jubb al-Jarrah (also spelled Jeb al-Jarah) is a village in central Syria, administratively part of the Homs Governorate. Nearby towns include al-Mukharram to the west, Salamiyah to the northwest and al-Qaryatayn further to the south. According to the Central Bureau of Statistics, Jubb al-Jarrah had a population of 2,255. Like other villages in the al-Mukharram District, Jubb al-Jarrah's inhabitants are predominantly Alawites. Historian Matti Moosa claims that prominent Alawite figures from the Ba'ath Party convened secretly at Jubb al-Jarrah on 30 January 1968 and made a decision there to abolish Muslim and Christian religious teaching in Syrian schools.

References

Populated places in al-Mukharram District
Towns in Syria
Alawite communities in Syria